Montague Valentine Bennett (19 February 1912 – 17 December 1940) was an English cricketer. Bennett's batting style is unknown, though it is known he was a fast-medium bowler.

Born at Glentham, Lincolnshire, Bennett made his debut for Lincolnshire against the Warwickshire Second XI in the 1932 Minor Counties Championship, establishing himself as a regular in the Lincolnshire team in the following seasons. He was selected to play for a combined Minor Counties cricket team in 1935 in a first-class match against Cambridge University at Fenner's. In a match which Cambridge University won by 4 wickets, Bennett ended the Minor Counties first-innings unbeaten on 16, while in Cambridge University's first-innings he bowled nine wicketless overs, conceding 27 runs. Batting in the Minor Counties second-innings, he was dismissed for 6 runs by John Cameron, while in the university second-innings he took the wickets of Mark Tindall and Hugh Bartlett, to finish with figures of 2/27 from fourteen overs. He continued to play minor counties cricket for Lincolnshire until 1939, making a total of 59 appearances for the county.

Bennett served as an Ordinary Coder in the Royal Navy during World War II, and was killed aboard  after it struck a mine off of the coast of the Isle of Wight on the night of 17 December 1940.

References

External links
Montague Bennett at ESPNcricinfo
Montague Bennett at CricketArchive

1912 births
1940 deaths
Military personnel from Lincolnshire
People from West Lindsey District
English cricketers
Lincolnshire cricketers
Minor Counties cricketers
Royal Navy personnel killed in World War II
Royal Navy sailors